Illusions (stylized as illusions) is a surreal puzzle video game published by Coleco for its ColecoVision console in 1984. The player maneuvers blobs around the screen, trying to get them to merge, or, alternatively, split apart. At times, lizards may chase the blobs around. A water bucket, when spilled, can cause the lizard to turn into a fish. If the fish remains there too long, however, it turns into a bird. The game was created by Nice Ideas, a division of Mattel that was located midway between Cannes and Nice.

References
Intellivision Classic Video Games System / Companies.

1984 video games
ColecoVision games
ColecoVision-only games
Europe-exclusive video games
Video games developed in France